The 1986 Harlow District Council election took place on 8 May 1986 to elect members of Harlow District Council in Essex, England. This was on the same day as other local elections. The Labour Party retained control of the council.

Election result

All comparisons in vote share are to the corresponding 1982 election.

Ward results

Brays Grove

Hare Street and Town Centre

Katherines With Sumner

Kingsmoor

Latton Bush

Little Parndon

Mark Hall North

Mark Hall South

Netteswell West

Old Harlow

Passmores

Potter Street

Stewards

Tye Green

References

1986
1986 English local elections
1980s in Essex